Lissoughter at , does not qualify to be an Arderin or a Vandeleur-Lynam, however, its prominence of  ranks it as a Marilyn.  Lissoughter is an isolated peak, situated between the Twelve Bens and Maumturks mountain ranges, at the southern entrance to the Inagh Valley, in the Connemara National Park, in Recess, County Galway, Ireland.

A quarry on Lissoughter's southern slopes (the Lissoughter-Derryclare quarry, named after the peak and the neighbouring Derryclare mountain), is a noted source of the green-coloured Connemara marble (sometimes called Connemara Lissoughter Marble).  As an isolated standalone peak, it is less frequented by hill-walkers, however, it is regarded for its views of the two ranges and the southern boglands of Connemara.

Gallery

Bibliography

See also

Twelve Bens, major range in Connemara
Maumturks, major range in Connemara
List of Marilyns in the British Isles

References

External links
MountainViews: The Irish Mountain Website, Lissoughter
MountainViews: Irish Online Mountain Database
The Database of British and Irish Hills , the largest database of British Isles mountains ("DoBIH")
Hill Bagging UK & Ireland, the searchable interface for the DoBIH

Marilyns of Ireland
Mountains and hills of County Galway
Mountains under 1000 metres